Emanuel Thabiso Nketu (born 25 January 1980) is an amateur boxer from Lesotho who competed at the 2008 Summer Olympics in the men's bantamweight division. He lost his opening bout to Bruno Julie of Mauritius 17-8 on points. Two years earlier, he had won two fights at the 2006 Commonwealth Games.

External links
 Bio

1980 births
Living people
Bantamweight boxers
Lesotho male boxers
Olympic boxers of Lesotho
Boxers at the 2008 Summer Olympics
Commonwealth Games competitors for Lesotho
Boxers at the 2006 Commonwealth Games